Gary James Paffett (born 24 March 1981 in Bromley) is a British racing driver. Having become a household name in the DTM, following fifteen years in the series and two championship wins, Paffett moved onto Formula E for the 2018/19 championship, after it was announced in 2017 that Mercedes would no longer be taking part in DTM. Paffett was also a test driver for the Williams Formula One team, having previously worked in a similar role at McLaren for a number of years, during the team's successful title winning years. Paffett progressed through the ranks of karting and junior formulae in the United Kingdom, winning the McLaren Autosport BRDC Award in 1999. He now lives in Ousden, Suffolk, England.

Racing career

1993 to 1999: Early Years
In 1993, Paffett joined the British Cadet Championships and earned himself a respectable third place. A year later he moved to British Junior TKM Championship and finished second overall. In 1995, he won the British Junior TKM Championship and also second place in the Junior ICA European Championship. Successes continued into 1996, winning the McLaren Mercedes Karting Champion of the Future award and also second in the British Junior ICA Championship. The next year he moved into single-seaters, winning the Formula Vauxhall Junior Winter Series, picking up the best newcomer's award in that series in the process. In 1998, he was Formula Vauxhall Junior Class B Champion with thirteen poles and thirteen wins, dominating every race of the season. He also set a track record which had never before been set by any "B" class car. He got promoted to the Formula Vauxhall Junior and won the championship with two track records, four wins, five fastest laps, three pole positions. At the season's end he was awarded the prestigious McLaren Autosport BRDC Young Driver of the Year award.

Formula Three
Moving up to Formula Three, he competed in the Scholarship class of the British F3 championship, becoming champion with twelve wins, thirteen fastest laps and thirteen pole positions. In 2001, moved overseas to the German F3 Championship racing with Keke Rosberg's race team, finishing sixth overall. Remaining in the series for 2002, he dominated the field winning the championship without ever losing the lead.

DTM

For 2003, Gary signed to drive for the new Brand Motorsport team in F3000, but the team withdrew from the series leaving Paffett and his team-mate Nicolas Minassian without drives. Mercedes contacted him and signed him to drive in the DTM with Rosberg's Mercedes AMG team in a year-old car, eventually finishing 11th overall. A year later, he was runner up with an up-to-date AMG-Mercedes C-Class and the HWA team taking four wins and one pole position. He was then champion the following year with five wins and four pole positions. In 2007, Gary returned to the DTM in a 2006 specification race car for the Persson Motorsport team alongside his McLaren F1 testing duties. At the second round at Oschersleben, Paffett became the first driver in the history of the series to win in a year old car. After a further year in older machinery, he was promoted back to the current Mercedes model for 2009, and finished runner-up in the championship, behind Timo Scheider.

2018 season 
In 2017, Mercedes announced it would leave DTM after the 2018 season. Since 2018 did also feature a rule change resulting in the cars having less downforce meaning that small contact would less likely result in race ending damage, Mercedes could come back from a dip in form over the last couple of years. In the first race at Hockenheim the Mercedes proved a serious contender and allowed Gary Paffett to take his first win since the Lausitz ring in 2013 in the first race at Hockenheim. The second Hockenheim race featured a momentous battle between Gary Paffett and Timo Glock which was won by the BMW driver. From here on, the Mercedes proved a very good car all through the season and with taking 3 wins and further 7 podiums, Paffett was at or very near the top of the table all season. In the mid-season, his main competitor was fellow Mercedes driver Paul Di Resta with the lead of the championship changing a couple of times between the two notably in Brands Hatch and Misano World Circuit. With Paffett having an unlucky raceweekend in the latter. In the last 3 race weekends, René Rast and his Audi team gave Paffett a very real challenge taking a win in all 6 races. This didn't prove to be enough however with Paffett taking the crown in Hockenheim at the last race of the season and thus closing the book on DTM for Mercedes with the drivers title, team title and the manufacturers title, providing Paffett and the Mercedes-AMG team with the perfect fairytale ending to their DTM careers.

Formula One

In December 2005 it was announced that he would not be returning to the DTM series to defend his title but instead would test full-time for McLaren-Mercedes during the 2006 season alongside Pedro de la Rosa. After the departure of Kimi Räikkönen to Ferrari, it was speculated that he may have been in contention for a 2007 race seat in the team alongside World Champion Fernando Alonso. However, due to the arrival of GP2 Champion, Lewis Hamilton, Paffett was overlooked for the drive.

Further to this, Paffett was released from his McLaren contract in October 2006, to search for better opportunities. It was widely speculated that he was likely to sign as a test driver at Honda, but Christian Klien was signed instead. A few weeks later however, Paffett was re-signed by McLaren as the team's second test driver, alongside de la Rosa.

He publicly stated that he was looking for a Formula One race seat for 2008, and was linked with the abortive Prodrive F1 project for that season. However, Prodrive failed to make it to the grid so Paffett stayed with McLaren as a test driver. Paffett was signed as Force India's reserve driver for the 2012 Australian Grand Prix as regular reserve driver Jules Bianchi was unavailable due to Formula Renault 3.5 Series testing commitments. On 17 November 2014, it was announced that Paffett would leave McLaren at the end of the 2014 season. This coincided with McLaren's switch to Honda engines for 2015.

For 2016, Paffett signed on with Williams as a simulator driver, alongside his duties in DTM. Team deputy Claire Williams said: "We're delighted to have someone with Gary's experience join us at Williams. He is a highly professional racing driver and his level of testing knowledge, and ability to analyse data, will significantly help to drive forward development of the FW38 throughout the season."

Formula E

In the 2018–19 Formula E season, Paffett drove for the HWA Racelab Formula E team, together with the Belgian Stoffel Vandoorne. Marking a new adventure for Gary, following his fifteen legendary years in the German Touring Car Series, this season's Formula E championship, will mark both Gary's and the HWA team's debut campaign in the 12-round all electric series. He finished the season 19th in the driver's standings after scoring points in Hong Kong, Paris and New York City. On 11 September 2019, it was announced that Paffett would be replaced by Nyck de Vries for the new Mercedes-Benz EQ Formula E Team in the 2019–20 Formula E season. Paffett moved into a management role within the team, working as a sporting and technical advisor, while also being a test and reserve driver.

Racing record

Complete International Formula 3000 results
(key) (Races in bold indicate pole position) (Races in italics indicate fastest lap).

Complete Deutsche Tourenwagen Masters results
(key) (Races in bold indicate pole position) (Races in italics indicate fastest lap).

† – Driver did not finish, but completed 90% of the race distance.
‡ – Shanghai was a non-championship round.

Complete Formula E results
(key) (Races in bold indicate pole position) (Races in italics indicate fastest lap)

References

External links

 
 

1981 births
Living people
People from Bromley
English racing drivers
Formula Palmer Audi drivers
British Formula Three Championship drivers
German Formula Three Championship drivers
International Formula 3000 drivers
Deutsche Tourenwagen Masters drivers
Deutsche Tourenwagen Masters champions
Formula E drivers
ART Grand Prix drivers
Mercedes-AMG Motorsport drivers
HWA Team drivers
Team Rosberg drivers
Strakka Racing drivers
Craft-Bamboo Racing drivers